Kemppi is a Finnish surname. Notable people with the surname include:

Antti Kemppi (1893–1974), Finnish farmer and politician
Hilkka Kemppi, Finnish politician
Juliette Kemppi (born 1994), Finnish women's footballer
Pekka Kemppi (1887–1957), Finnish politician
Usko Kemppi (1907–1994), Finnish composer, lyricist, author and screenwriter

Finnish-language surnames